Gone: A Collection of EPs 2000-2007 is a compilation album by Japanese rock band Mono, released in 2007. It is a compilation of several EPs and non-album tracks, ordered chronologically. Limited to 3,000 copies, some of which are on colored vinyl.

Track listing

Notes
 Tracks 1 and 2 are from Hey, You. Track 3 is from the Mono/Pelican split (Later released on You Are There in 2006 with slight changes). Tracks 4 and 5 are from the Memorie dal Futuro 10" EP. Track 6 is from Temporary Residence's "Thankful" compilation. Tracks 7, 8, 9, and 10 are all from The Phoenix Tree EP.

References

External links
 Mono - Gone - Temporary Residence Limited

Mono (Japanese band) albums
2007 compilation albums